Kendriya Vidyalaya No. 2 AFA is a school situated in Air Force Academy, Dundigul, near Hyderabad, India. It is run by the Kendriya Vidyalaya Sangathan, an autonomous body formed by the Indian Ministry of Human Resource Development.

The Vidyalaya has classes from 1 to 12 with Science stream at 10+2 level. The Vidyalaya is affiliated to the CBSE and follows the 10+2 pattern of education. Apart from the teaching learning process, the students take part in co-curricular activities, sports and games, club activities, work experience, Scouts and Guides, computer education, vocational training, adventure programmes and value education.

Sports Activities

KV2 AFA encourages its students to take part in sports and co-curricular activities. The school organises a sports day annually in which the houses of the school take part in intra-school sports events. The school has won trophies in swimming, cricket, athletics, volleyball and other games at regional and national level.

The school has a children's park which provide recreation to the primary students.

Teacher achievers
Mr. T. Ravi Kumar awarded National incentive award by KVS(HQ) for his innovation in origami during the academic year 2012-13.

See also
 Kendriya Vidyalaya Sangathan
 List of Kendriya Vidyalayas
 Kendriya Vidyalaya No. 1 AFA, Dundigal

References

External links
 Kendriya Vidyalaya No.2, AFA, Dundigal 
 http://wikimapia.org/3133378/Kendriya-Vidyalaya-No-2-AFA

Kendriya Vidyalayas
Schools in Hyderabad, India
Educational institutions in India with year of establishment missing